King Kapara (also Gabara) was an Aramean king of Bit Bahiani, one of the Post-Hittite states, centered in Guzana (modern Tell Halaf, in northeastern Syria). He ruled sometime in the 10th or 9th century BCE, according to some estimations ca. 950-875 BCE. He built Bit-hilani, a monumental palace in Post-Hittite style, discovered by Max von Oppenheim in 1911, with a rich decoration of statues and relief orthostats.

In 894 BC, the Assyrian king Adad-nirari II recorded the site in his archives as a tributary Aramaean city-state. In 808 BC the city and its surrounding area was reduced to a province of the Neo-Assyrian Empire.

References

Sources

External links
Orthostat relief: archer
Orthostat relief: hunting scene
Orthostat relief: lion hunt
Orthostat relief:  Relief with Two Heroes

Aramean kings
10th-century BC Aramean kings
9th-century BC Aramean kings